The 2014 New York gubernatorial election took place on November 4, 2014. Incumbent Democratic Governor Andrew Cuomo sought re-election to a second term in office, though incumbent Lieutenant Governor Robert Duffy did not seek re-election. Cuomo and his running mate, former U.S. Representative Kathy Hochul, won contested primaries, while Republican Rob Astorino, the Westchester County Executive, and his running mate (Chemung County Sheriff Chris Moss) were unopposed for their party's nomination. Astorino and Moss were also cross-nominated by the Conservative Party and the Stop Common Core Party.

Democrat Andrew Cuomo, then serving as Attorney General of New York, was elected Governor in 2010. Cuomo defeated Republican businessman Carl Paladino by a nearly 2 to 1 margin, 63% to 33%. Cuomo succeeded retiring Democratic Governor David Paterson. Entering the 2014 campaign, Cuomo enjoyed high approval ratings and a large campaign war chest that totaled $33 million as of January 2014. The Cook Political Report, Daily Kos Elections, Governing, RealClearPolitics, The Rothenberg Political Report and Sabato's Crystal Ball all rated the 2014 New York gubernatorial election as "Safe Democratic". On Election Day, Cuomo and Hochul defeated Astorino and Moss by a margin of 14 percentage points.

Democrats flipped Erie County, and Republicans flipped the following counties: Cayuga, Chemung, Chenango, Columbia, Cortland, Delaware, Dutchess, Greene, Herkimer, Jefferson, Lewis, Livingston, Madison, Monroe, Montgomery, Oneida, Ontario, Orange, Oswego, Otsego, Putnam, Rensselaer, St. Lawerence, Saratoga, Schenectady, Schuyler, Seneca, Suffolk, Sullivan, Ulster, Warren, Washington, Wayne, and Yates.

This is the last gubernatorial election in which the counties of Clinton, Franklin, Essex, and Broome voted Democratic, and the last in which Monroe and Ulster voted Republican.

Democratic primary
Progressive minor parties saw an opportunity to make headway in the state due to Cuomo's relatively conservative stances on taxes and spending. A poll commissioned by businessman and progressive political activist Bill Samuels in March 2014 indicated that even an unknown left-wing third-party challenger on the Working Families Party line could garner between 6% and 13% of the vote without threatening Cuomo's chances of winning re-election. A later poll by the Siena Research Institute taken of 772 registered voters from April 12–17, 2014, with a margin of error of ± 3.5%, found Cuomo taking 39% to Republican candidate Rob Astorino's 24% and an unnamed Working Families Party candidate also at 24%. A Quinnipiac poll conducted in May 2014 produced a similar result to Siena's, with Cuomo at 37%, Astorino at 24% and the third party candidate at 22%. The Working Families Party nonetheless cross-endorsed Cuomo in a bitterly contested convention vote, leaving Howie Hawkins of the Green Party as the sole progressive challenger assured of a place on the ballot.

In May 2014, after widespread speculation, Lieutenant Governor Robert Duffy confirmed that he would not run for a second term, expressing a desire to return to his home city of Rochester. Byron Brown, the Mayor of Buffalo; Kathy Hochul, a former U.S. Representative; Steve Bellone, the current Suffolk County Executive; Kevin Law, the former deputy Suffolk County executive; and Republican Joanie Mahoney, the County Executive of Onondaga County; were considered to be potential replacements. Within the Cuomo administration, potential names included Matt Driscoll, the former mayor of Syracuse; RoAnn Destito, a former Assemblywoman; and Cesar A. Perales, the Secretary of State of New York. Hochul was revealed as Cuomo's running mate during the state Democratic convention on May 21, 2014.

Candidates

Declared
 Andrew Cuomo, incumbent Governor
 Running mate: Kathy Hochul, former U.S. Representative
 Randy Credico, comedian, activist, Libertarian nominee for the U.S. Senate in 2010 and Tax Wall Street nominee for Mayor of New York City in 2013
 No running mate
 Zephyr Teachout, associate professor of law at Fordham University
 Running mate: Tim Wu, professor of law at Columbia University

Failed to qualify
 Raquel McPherson (removed from ballot)
 Sam Sloan, chess player, publisher, Libertarian candidate for governor in 2010 and War Veterans nominee for Mayor of New York City in 2013 (removed from ballot)
 Running mate: Nenad Bach

Polling

Results
Primary elections were held on September 9, 2014.

Republican primary
No Republican gubernatorial primary was held in 2014.

It was believed that the Republicans would nominate someone who was not up for re-election in 2014 and so did not have to give up their office to run, and who would use the campaign to raise their profile for a more competitive statewide bid in the future. Rob Astorino, the Westchester County Executive and the only Republican to enter the race, was not up for re-election until 2017. Business magnate and television personality Donald Trump flirted with a run, but decided against it, instead running for president as a Republican in 2016 and winning. Other potential candidates who did not run were former U.S. Representative Vito Fossella, Dutchess County Executive Marcus Molinaro and businessman and 2010 candidate for New York State Comptroller Harry Wilson.

Assemblywomen Jane Corwin and Nicole Malliotakis both declined overtures to be the party's nominee for lieutenant governor, as did Rensselaer County Executive Kathleen M. Jimino and former United States Attorney for the Western District of New York Michael A. Battle. On May 13, Astorino announced Chemung County Sheriff Chris Moss as his running mate.

On May 15, 2014, the Republican Party nominated Astorino for Governor of New York and Moss for Lieutenant Governor of New York.

Candidates

Declared
 Rob Astorino, Westchester County Executive
 Running mate: Chris Moss, Sheriff of Chemung County

Declined
 John Catsimatidis, businessman and candidate for Mayor of New York City in 2013
 Chris Collins, U.S. Representative and former Erie County Executive
 Edward F. Cox, lawyer, chairman of the New York Republican State Committee and candidate for the U.S. Senate in 2006
 Greg Edwards, Chautauqua County Executive and nominee for Lieutenant Governor of New York in 2010
 Chris Gibson, U.S. Representative
 Christopher Jacobs, Erie County Clerk and former Secretary of State of New York
 Steven McLaughlin, New York State Assemblyman
 Carl Paladino, Buffalo Public Schools Board of Education member and nominee for governor in 2010
 Donald Trump, business magnate and television personality

Major third parties
Besides the Democratic and Republican parties, the Conservative, Green, Independence and Working Families parties are qualified New York parties. These parties have automatic ballot access.

Conservative
Conservative Party chairman Michael R. Long endorsed Rob Astorino in February 2014. Buffalo Public Schools Board of Education member and 2010 Republican gubernatorial nominee Carl Paladino originally stated he would seek the Conservative Party nomination if the Republicans nominated Astorino; however, by March 2014, Paladino indicated that he would not run for governor in 2014 and would support Astorino if Donald Trump did not run. On May 31, 2014, the Party nominated Astorino and Moss for governor and lieutenant governor, respectively.

Nominee
Rob Astorino, Republican nominee

Green
In contrast to the other qualified parties, the Green Party of New York traditionally endorses its own candidates. The party held its nominating convention on May 17, 2014.

Nominee
 Howie Hawkins, labor activist and Green Party nominee for governor in 2010
 Running mate: Brian Jones, teacher, activist and actor from New York City

Independence
The Independence Party of New York, which traditionally cross-endorses the candidate most likely to get them the most votes, was expected to nominate incumbent Governor Andrew Cuomo as it did in 2010. Republican Rob Astorino refused the line, and several members of the Democratic Party called on Cuomo to do the same.

Despite the controversy, Cuomo accepted the nomination on May 22, 2014.

Nominee
 Andrew Cuomo, incumbent governor

Working Families
The Working Families Party traditionally cross-endorses Democrats, but many of its members (most of which are labor unions) have expressed reservations over endorsing incumbent Governor Andrew Cuomo as they did in 2010.

The WFP convention, held on May 31, chose Cuomo over professor Zephyr Teachout by a 59%–41% margin in a contentious floor vote. Cuomo's supporters negotiated an agreement in which the governor would support the party agenda in exchange for their vote, expressly attempting to keep the party line solely as a second line for the Democrats; this agreement was met with widespread and vocal skepticism from Teachout's supporters, who insisted the WFP hold to its principles and that Cuomo could not be trusted to hold up to his end of the bargain.

Candidates

Nominee
 Andrew Cuomo, incumbent governor

Declared
 Howie Hawkins, presumptive Green Party nominee
 Zephyr Teachout, law professor at Fordham University

Declined
 Diane Ravitch, former Assistant Secretary of Education
 Bill Samuels, activist. Samuels instead announced his intent to pursue the lieutenant governor line in the Democratic primary, a position he also considered pursuing in 2010. Samuels dropped out of the race after Teachout lost the WFP nomination to Cuomo, thus implying that Samuels was planning to be Teachout's running mate.

Minor third parties
Any candidate not among the six qualified New York parties (Democratic, Republican, Conservative, Green, Independence and Working Families) must petition their way onto the ballot; they do not face primary elections. Independent nominating petitions began collecting signatures on July 8 and were due to the state by August 19.

Libertarian
The Libertarian Party of New York held its nominating convention on April 26, 2014. The nominating process required five rounds of voting, after which Michael McDermott was nominated.

Candidates

Nominee
 Michael McDermott, real estate broker and nominee for New York's 3rd congressional district in 2012
Running mate: Chris Edes, nominee for the U.S. Senate in 2012

Unsuccessful
 Richard Cooper, resident of Westbury
 Randy Credico, comedian, activist, Libertarian nominee for the U.S. Senate in 2010 and Tax Wall Street nominee for Mayor of New York City in 2013
 Nathan Lebron, information technology specialist and perennial candidate

Declined
 Kristin M. Davis, former madam and Anti-Prohibition Party nominee for governor in 2010
 Bill Schmidt

Sapient
Steven Cohn, Long Island attorney who attempted to run on a "Tea Party" line in the 2010 election but had his petitions rejected
Running mate: Bobby Kalotee
The party initially filed with Kendy Guzman as the running mate. As of August 26, Guzman had turned down the nomination and was replaced with Kalotee, the former chairman of the forcibly-dissolved Nassau County wing of the Independence Party.

Cohn is the only candidate on the ballot who did not participate in the lone gubernatorial debate.

Stop Common Core
The "Stop Common Core Party" (renamed after the election to the Reform Party) is a single-issue ballot line conceived by Republican nominee Rob Astorino.

Nominee
Rob Astorino, Republican nominee

Women's Equality
The Women's Equality Party is a political party created by Gov. Andrew Cuomo and his allies. The Party was designed to take advantage of New York's electoral fusion laws, which allow candidates to appear on multiple parties' lines in the same election. The Party is named after the Women's Equality Act, a bill that failed in the New York State Senate in 2013 and 2014 due to a stalemate over an abortion rights provision in the bill.

The formation of the Party was particularly controversial among feminists (particularly Zephyr Teachout, Cuomo's primary opponent) and was noted for its use of questionable campaign imagery, particularly a tour bus that bore a striking resemblance to a box of Tampax tampons.  Additionally, the Working Families Party asserted that the formation of the Women's Equality Party was an attempt to undermine the WFP as a viable party in New York politics.

Nominee
Andrew Cuomo, incumbent governor

Failed to make ballot
Socialist Workers Party: For the second straight election, the Socialist Workers Party waged a write-in candidacy for the governor's seat, with John Studer as the nominee.
Constitution Party: Donna Mulvihill, a homeschooling activist from Honeoye Lake, sought petitions to run for governor on the Constitution Party line before abruptly withdrawing from the race the day before petitions were due, citing her father's death. This is the second consecutive election in which the party has failed to collect enough signatures for governor.
Life and Justice Party: Disability rights activist Michael Carey submitted petitions to form a Life and Justice Party with himself as the gubernatorial candidate and with Republican lieutenant governor nominee Chris Moss listed as his running mate. Moss did not accept his designation as the lieutenant governor candidate on the Life and Justice line. The petitions were later ruled invalid.
Liberal Party of New York: No candidate. The party openly discussed cross-endorsing incumbent governor Cuomo in an effort to regain ballot access but never did so.
 Rent Is Too Damn High Party: Perennial candidate Jimmy McMillan made a fourth attempt at running for governor on his self-created line, with Christialle Felix as his running mate. His petitions were later challenged and invalidated after it was discovered McMillan had photocopied many of the petitions to give the appearance of more signatures.

General election
In July 2014, Astorino called for New Jersey Governor Chris Christie to resign his position as chair of the Republican Governors Association due to his refusal to support Astorino's campaign, which Christie publicly characterized as a "lost cause." Astorino claimed that Christie refused to support him due to Christie's relationship with Cuomo.

Debates
Complete video of debate, October 22, 2014

Predictions

Polling

Results
Cuomo handily defeated Astorino by a 54.19%-40.25% margin, although this margin was smaller than Cuomo's victory margin in 2010. Cuomo won all five counties of New York City, along with Westchester, Rockland, and Nassau counties; Astorino won a supermajority of upstate counties. Hawkins's presence on the ballot was credited by some as having a spoiler effect that allowed Astorino to win Monroe County and other upstate counties that traditionally vote Democratic.

Aftermath
The Green Party took Row D on the ballot, surpassing the Independence and Working Families Parties (both of whom lost significant vote share but still qualified for automatic ballot status through 2018) but not surpassing the Conservative Party, which retained Row C with 6 percent of the vote. The Libertarian Party, after a 2010 showing in which it narrowly fell short of the 50,000 votes needed for automatic ballot access, missed that measure by a wide margin in 2014; the Party's candidate earned less than 17,000 votes. The Sapient Party was a non-factor with fewer than 5,000 votes. Two new political parties—the Women's Equality Party and the Stop Common Core Party—surpassed the 50,000-vote threshold and attained automatic ballot status.

References

External links
New York gubernatorial election, 2014 at Ballotpedia
Campaign contributions at FollowTheMoney.org

Gubernatorial
2014
New York
Andrew Cuomo
Howie Hawkins